Horsfieldia sterilis is a species of plant in the family Myristicaceae. It is endemic to Borneo where it is confined to Sabah.

References

sterilis
Endemic flora of Borneo
Flora of Sabah
Vulnerable plants
Taxonomy articles created by Polbot